Lethata herbacea is a moth in the family Depressariidae. It was described by Edward Meyrick in 1931. It is found in Brazil (São Paulo).

References

Moths described in 1931
Lethata